Park Jung-hoon (born June 21, 1982) is a South Korean cinematographer and film director. Park gained international recognition with the action thriller The Villainess, which premiered at the Cannes Film Festival in 2017, with four awards as Director of Photography. Park has been working in the film industry for almost two decades on a variety of genres, including low-budget films, independent films, and documentaries.

Career

Early years 
Park Jung-hoon was born and raised in Taean, Chungcheongnam-do, South Korea. His parents own a small video rental shop, so he had many opportunities to watch movies from an early age. He dreamed of working in the movie industry, but due to his high passing grade score for the Department of Film at university, going to the film department seemed like a day dream. He prepared for the entrance exam in the art major until the second grade. However, he couldn't hold his passion for movies in his heart and eventually gave up going to college.

Park moved to Seoul from his hometown of Taean to pursue a career in the film industry. At 19 years old (Korean Age), he became the youngest member of the filming team for Im Kwon-taek’s 2002 movie Painted Fire or Chihwaseon.

In 2003, he worked as a filming staff of Kim Eui-suk‘s movie Cheongpung myeongwol, also known as Sword in the Moon. He then worked as filming staff for Im Kwon-taek‘s movie Low Life  Haryu Insaeng (2004). He enlisted in mandatory military service three days after filming for Low Life. After finishing his service in 2006, he joined the crank-in for the movie Beyond the Years or Cheonnyeonhak, directed by Im Kwon-taek.

He worked as a staff member for director Zhang Lu for two movies, Desert Dream (2007) and Iri (2008). He also worked for Director Jeon Soo-il on low-budget art films such as Himalaya, Where the Wind Dwells (2008) and I Came from Busan (2010), also called Youngdo Bridge.

A career as director of photography 
After building a career as a member of cinematographer teams for various works, Park made his debut as director of photography in the second work of director Kim Hee-jung, “Green Grape Candy: A Promise 17 Years Ago” in 2011. The movie was a project to commemorate the 10th anniversary of the residence at the Cannes Film Festival. The movie also won an award at the 13th Seoul International Women's Film Festival in 2011. 

In the following year, Park worked as director of photography in two low-budget movies: Chubby Revolution (2012) directed by Min Doo-sik and Norigae (2012) directed by Choi Seung-ho.

He worked as director of photography on Mizo (2013) and Snowpath (2015).

In 2017, Park gained international recognition with his first commercial feature film, The Villainess. This South Korean action thriller was directed by Jung Byung-gil and stars Kim Ok-vin. The film had its world premiere at the 70th Cannes Film Festival in May 2017, where it received a four-minute standing ovation He won four awards as Director of Photography for this movie.

Debut as director 
Vistari, Himalaya was Park’s first feature-length film. The documentary movie was screened at the 2016 Jeonju International Festival. The movie tells the story about four musicians’ trip to Nepal, people they met there, their experiences and challenges they faced, and the small but precious realizations they made.

Ventured into tetevision 
In 2021 Park wascurrently developing his first foray into television. He joined director Yoo Je-won in remake project of 2004 South Korean film Mr. Handy, Mr. Hong. Hometown Cha-Cha-Cha was a romance drama starring Shin Min-a, Kim Seon-ho and Lee Sang-yi. The 16-episode drama aired on tvN from August 28 to October 17, 2021. As a simulcast Netflix Original, it was also available for streaming on Netflix.

Filmography

Film

As director in short film

As director and cinematographer in short documentary

As director in documentary feature film

As part of cinematographer team

As short film director of photography

As feature film director of photography

Television

As director of photography

Awards and recognitions

References

External links 
 
 
  
 Park Jung-Hoon at Naver 

Park Jung-hoon at [YouTube]

South Korean cinematographers
South Korean film directors
1982 births
Living people